G road may refer to :
 China National Highways, a series of trunk roads throughout mainland China with G-prefixed road numbers
 In the United States:
 County-designated highways in zone G in Michigan
 Corridor G, part of the Appalachian Development Highway System in Kentucky and West Virginia